Americentrism, also known as American-centrism or US-centrism, is a tendency to assume the culture of the United States is more important than those of other countries or to judge foreign cultures based on American cultural standards. It refers to the practice of viewing the world from an overly US-focused perspective, with an implied belief, either consciously or subconsciously, in the preeminence of American culture.

The term is not to be confused with American exceptionalism, which is the assertion that the United States is qualitatively different from other nations and is often accompanied by the notion that the United States has superiority over every other nation.

In the media 
American television networks have been perceived to contain an Americentric bias in the selection of their material.

Another instance of Americentrism is in the high focus companies have on US markets in relation to others. Often, products produced and developed outside the US are still marketed as typically American.

According to the European Commission, internet governance (in particular that related to the NSA) is too Americentric. It criticized the major role of American company ICANN in its administration.

The English Wikipedia has been criticized for having an Americentric systemic bias with regards to its occasional preference towards US English sources, language, and spelling.

See also 
 Afrocentrism
 American exceptionalism
 American nationalism
 American way
 Anti-Americanism
 Ethnocentrism
 Eurocentrism
 Indocentrism
 Sinocentrism

Notes 

Geocultural perspectives
Ethnocentrism
Political neologisms
 Autological words